Leše is a small village to the north above Sava in the Municipality of Litija in central Slovenia. The area is part of the traditional region of Upper Carniola. It is now included with the rest of the municipality in the Central Sava Statistical Region.

References

External links

Leše on Geopedia

Populated places in the Municipality of Litija